"rose" is the third single by Japanese singer Anna Tsuchiya under the pseudonym ANNA inspi' NANA (BLACK STONES). It was released on 28 June 2006 by Mad Pray Records, a subsidiary of Avex. It is Tsuchiya's highest ranking song, spending ten weeks on the Oricon Style chart and reaching #6 on 10 July 2006.

Track listing

Commercial endorsements
"rose" was used as the opening theme to the anime adaption of the manga NANA. Its B-side, "Lovin' You", was the theme for the Japanese release of the film Silent Hill.

References

2006 singles
Anna Tsuchiya songs